Mitragyna is a genus of trees in the family Rubiaceae found in the tropical and subtropical regions of Asia and Africa. Members of this genus contain antimalarial and analgesic indole alkaloids.

Species
, Plants of the World Online accepted the following species:
Mitragyna ciliata Aubrév. & Pellegr.
Mitragyna diversifolia (Wall. ex G.Don) Havil.
Mitragyna hirsuta Havil.
Mitragyna inermis (Willd.) Kuntze
Mitragyna parvifolia (Roxb.) Korth.
Mitragyna rotundifolia (Roxb.) Kuntze
Mitragyna rubrostipulata (K.Schum.) Havil.
Mitragyna speciosa Korth.
Mitragyna stipulosa (DC.) Kuntze
Mitragyna tubulosa (Arn.) K.Schum.

References

External links
 Kratom (Mitragyna Speciosa)
 

Rubiaceae genera
Naucleeae